Lieutenant Carrick Stewart Paul DFC (5 February 1893–22 January 1919 was a World War I flying ace from New Zealand. He was credited with five aerial victories in Palestine between May and August 1918 when flying a Bristol F.2 Fighter.

Biography
Carrick Paul was born at Thames in New Zealand on 5 February 1893. After the outbreak of the First World War he enlisted in the Australian Imperial Force, and was posted to the 6th Light Horse Regiment. In April 1916, he was mentioned in despatches. He later transferred to the Australian Flying Corps and served in the Sinai and Palestine campaign.

Flying a Bristol F.2 fighter, Paul claimed two victories on 23 May 1918, near Nablus. One of the two Albatros D.Vs was piloted by German ace Gustav Schneidewind, who was wounded in both arms. Paul then destroyed Rumpler reconnaissance planes on 13 June, 28 July, and 16 August 1918. The July win was shared with Alan Brown and Garfield Finlay.

Paul and his observer William Weir were jointly awarded the Distinguished Flying Cross (DFC) on 8 February 1919. Paul never knew of the honor; while on the voyage home to New Zealand, he drowned on 22 January 1919.

The announcement of his DFC was made in The London Gazette. The published citation read:

Paul is listed on the Chatby Memorial, in Alexandria, Egypt, which commemorates military personnel of the Commonwealth who died at sea during the First World War and have no known grave.

Notes

References

1893 births
1919 deaths
New Zealand World War I flying aces
Australian World War I flying aces
Recipients of the Distinguished Flying Cross (United Kingdom)
People from Thames, New Zealand
Deaths by drowning
Australian military personnel of World War I